Alfons Julen (20 February 1899 – 9 May 1988) was a cross country skier from Zermatt, Switzerland who competed in military patrol at the first winter Olympics in Chamonix in 1924. The Swiss team, which consisted of Alfred Aufdenblatten, Julen, Anton Julen and Denis Vaucher, finished first in the competition.

Julen competed in cross country 18 km at the 1928 Winter Olympics in St. Moritz, and in military patrol, which was a demonstration event in 1928. He was brother of Anton Julen, and cousin of the Olympians Oswald Julen (Nordic combined) and Simon Julen (cross country skiing).

References

External links

1899 births
1988 deaths
Swiss military patrol (sport) runners
Swiss male cross-country skiers
Olympic biathletes of Switzerland
Military patrol competitors at the 1924 Winter Olympics
Olympic gold medalists for Switzerland
People from Zermatt
Medalists at the 1924 Winter Olympics
Olympic cross-country skiers of Switzerland
Cross-country skiers at the 1928 Winter Olympics
Sportspeople from Valais
20th-century Swiss people